Barberiella is a genus of plant bugs in the family Miridae. There are at least two described species in Barberiella.

Species
These two species belong to the genus Barberiella:
 Barberiella formicoides Poppius, 1914
 Barberiella humeralis (Poppius, 1921)

References

Further reading

 
 
 

Miridae genera
Articles created by Qbugbot
Herdoniini